Benoît Cabello (born 27 February 1980) is a French rugby union player. His position is Hooker and he currently plays for Clermont Auvergne in the Top 14.

He began his career with the Paris clubs, moving from Racing Métro to Stade Français, before settling at Bourgoin in 2003, where he would stay for five years, becoming a key part of the side as the starting Hooker and a semi-regular try scorer. He moved to Clermont Auvergne in 2008.

Honours
Top 14 Champion – 2009–10

References

1980 births
Living people
French rugby union players
Sportspeople from Perpignan
ASM Clermont Auvergne players
Rugby union hookers